Maribo is a Danish semi-hard cheese made from cow's milk. Named after the town of Maribo on the island of Lolland, it has a firm, dry interior; a creamy texture; and many small, irregular holes. It has a pale tan rind covered in yellow wax. Its flavour is tangy, and it is sometimes seasoned with caraway seeds.

See also
 List of cheeses

References

Further reading
 

Danish cheeses
Cow's-milk cheeses